Alassane Ndao (born 31 December 1996) is a Senegalese professional footballer who plays as a winger for Turkish club Antalyaspor on loan from Saudi Arabian club Al-Ahli.

Club career

Fatih Karagümrük
Ndao made his professional debut with Fatih Karagümrük in a 3-0 Süper Lig win over Yeni Malatyaspor on 12 September 2020.

Al-Ahli
On 31 July 2021, Ndao joined Saudi Arabian club Al-Ahli.

Antalyaspor (loan)
On 21 January 2022, Ndao joined Antalyaspor on a loan spell, until the end of the season.

International career
Ndao made his debut for Senegal on 22 July 2017 in African Nations Championship qualifier against Sierra Leone, and scored in 51st-minute.

Career statistics

Club

International

References

External links

1996 births
Living people
Footballers from Dakar
Senegalese footballers
Senegal international footballers
Association football wingers
Fatih Karagümrük S.K. footballers
Al-Ahli Saudi FC players
Antalyaspor footballers
Senegal Premier League players
TFF First League players
Süper Lig players
Saudi Professional League players
Senegalese expatriate footballers
Expatriate footballers in Turkey
Senegalese expatriate sportspeople in Turkey
Expatriate footballers in Saudi Arabia
Senegalese expatriate sportspeople in Saudi Arabia